Francis Redding Tillou Nicholls (August 20, 1834January 4, 1912) was an American attorney, politician, judge, and a brigadier general in the Confederate States Army during the American Civil War. He served two terms as the 28th Governor of Louisiana, first from 1876 to 1880 after the Reconstruction era ended and from 1888 to 1892.

Early life and career
Nicholls was born at Prevost Memorial Hospital in Donaldsonville, Louisiana, the seat of Ascension Parish, the seventh son of Thomas Clark Nicholls (himself a seventh son) and Louisa Hannah (Drake) Nicholls, a sister of the poet Joseph Rodman Drake and sister-in-law of Francis Redding Tillou. His paternal grandfather was Cornish American Edward Church Nicholls. He attended Jefferson Academy in New Orleans and graduated in 1855 from the United States Military Academy at West Point, New York. Initially assigned as a second lieutenant in the 2nd U.S. Artillery Regiment, he served in the Third Seminole War in Florida, but resigned his commission after a year and returned home.

He then attended the University of Louisiana (subsequently Tulane University) in New Orleans. He practiced law in Napoleonville, the seat of Assumption Parish, until the start of the Civil War.

Two weeks after the surrender of Fort Sumter in the harbor of Charleston, Nicholls wed the former Caroline Zilpha Guion, the daughter of George Seth Guion and the former Caroline Lucretia Winder. The couple had one son, Francis Welman Nicholls (born 1863), and six daughters, Caroline (born 1865), Louisa (born 1868), Harriet (born 1870), Virginia (born 1873), Margaret (born 1875), and Elizabeth (born 1877).

Civil War

Nicholls joined the Confederate Army in 1861 as a captain in the 8th Louisiana Infantry Regiment and participated in the First Battle of Bull Run and in the Shenandoah Valley Campaign in Virginia, where his left arm was amputated. In July 1862 he became colonel of the just formed 15th Louisiana Infantry and on October 14, 1862, Nicholls was promoted to the rank of brigadier general and given command of a brigade of Louisiana infantry. While leading a brigade during the Battle of Chancellorsville, a shell ripped off Nicholls' left foot, forcing him to retire from combat service. According to James Whitcomb Brougher Sr., in Life and Laughter, (p. 89) he lost an eye at Richmond. Disabled and unfit for further field command, he was transferred to the Trans-Mississippi Department to direct the Volunteer and Conscript Bureau until the end of the war.

In 1874, while testifying before a Congressional Committee investigating election fraud in Louisiana, Nicholls said of his service in the war; "I think that we made the attempt [the war for secession] under the most favorable circumstances...of course we all regret our want for success; but I do not believe that there is anywhere any desire for a renewal of the attempt." and that "My war record is a source of private misfortune without a corresponding gain to anyone. My services to my country were not worth the price to me. Every battle I went into I was wounded, and so I could not serve all the time."

Postbellum
After the war, Nicholls returned to his law practice.  In 1876, he ran for governor against the Republican Stephen B. Packard. The outcome was disputed, and both men claimed victory. Nicholls garnered a majority of 8,000 votes, but the Republican-controlled State Returning Board cited irregularities and declared Packard the winner. As part of the Compromise of 1877 to resolve the disputed presidential election of 1876, President Hayes recognized the Democrat Nicholls as the winner.

During his first term, he battled political corruption, which was epitomized by Samuel James, the operator of the convict lease system, state Treasurer Edward A. Burke, and Lieutenant Governor Louis A. Wiltz, who supported the corrupt Louisiana Lottery.

Nicholls chaired the Louisiana Constitutional Convention of 1879, and returned the state capital from New Orleans to Baton Rouge.

Nicholls was governor of Louisiana in 1891, the year eleven Italians were lynched in New Orleans. Shortly before the incident, as thousands of angry protesters gathered near the Parish Prison, the Italian consul in New Orleans sought the governor's help. Nicholls declined to intervene.

After his tenure as governor closed, Nicholls became Chief Justice of the Louisiana Supreme Court in 1892, a post which he held until 1911. He also grew sugarcane and other crops on his Ridgefield Plantation near Thibodaux, the seat of Lafourche Parish. He died at Ridgefield. Francis and Caroline Nicholls, Thomas Clark Nicholls, and other family members are interred in St. John's Episcopal Church and Cemetery in Thibodaux.

Memorialization
From 1913 to about 1950, there was a vocational school at 3649 Laurel Street in New Orleans named for Nicholls. It opened as the Francis T. Nicholls Industrial School for Girls, and offered secondary vocational training, concentrating on apparel manufacturing. The school was later renamed Nicholls Vocational School for Girls, and even later Nicholls Evening Vocational School.

In 1940, a new public high school, Francis T. Nicholls High School, was opened at 3820 St. Claude Avenue in New Orleans. In the late 1990s the high school was renamed for former slave and abolitionist leader Frederick Douglass. It is now a charter school, part of the KIPP Family Schools and known as KIPP Renaissance High School. During the 1960s, the school was integrated and black students fought to change the team names from The Rebels and the mascot from the Confederate flag to the current Bobcat.

There is a "Governor Nicholls Street" in New Orleans.  Where it meets the Mississippi River near the downriver end of the French Quarter, there is a Governor Nicholls Street Wharf. Atop the wharf shed there, the United States Coast Guard built a manned control tower with a red and green traffic signal to control vessel traffic rounding Algiers Point.  When speaking to the controller via marine VHF radio, mariners address him or her familiarly as "Governor Nick."

In Baton Rouge, there is a sculpture of Nicholls by Isidore Konti.

Nicholls State University, founded in 1948, is a public university located in Thibodaux, Louisiana. Nicholls is part of the University of Louisiana System. Originally called Francis T. Nicholls Junior College, the university is named for Francis T. Nicholls.

He is played by James Bearden in the 1999 HBO original film Vendetta.

See also

List of American Civil War generals (Confederate)
Louisiana Tigers

Notes

References
 Eicher, John H., and David J. Eicher, Civil War High Commands. Stanford: Stanford University Press, 2001. .
 "Francis Tillou Nicholls", A Dictionary of Louisiana Biography, Vol. 2 (1988), p. 603.
Garnie W. McGinty, "Francis Tillou Redding Nicholls", North Louisiana History, Vol. 15, No. 1 (Winter 1984), pp. 30–39
 Sifakis, Stewart. Who Was Who in the Civil War. New York: Facts On File, 1988. .
 Warner, Ezra J. Generals in Gray: Lives of the Confederate Commanders. Baton Rouge: Louisiana State University Press, 1959. .

External links

State of Louisiana - Biography
Biography from History Central
Cemetery Memorial by La-Cemeteries
Nicholls State University

United States Military Academy alumni
United States Army officers
Confederate States Army brigadier generals
People of Louisiana in the American Civil War
Democratic Party governors of Louisiana
Louisiana lawyers
1834 births
1912 deaths
People from Thibodaux, Louisiana
American people of Cornish descent
Tulane University alumni
Tulane University Law School alumni
Chief Justices of the Louisiana Supreme Court
American amputees
American politicians with disabilities
People from Donaldsonville, Louisiana
People from Napoleonville, Louisiana
19th-century American judges
19th-century American lawyers
19th-century American Episcopalians
American anti-corruption activists